Potsy, Pottsy, or Potsie is a nickname. Uses include:

Potsie Weber, character in the television show Happy Days
Potsy Jones (1909–1990), American football player
Potsy Clark (1894–1972), American football player and coach
Pottsy, a comic strip by Jay Irving
Pottsy, a character in M (1951) played by Raymond Burr
Pottsy, a character in Turnout played by Peter Ferdinando
Benjamin "Pottsy" Potts, a participant in Whale Wars
Potsy, a variant of hopscotch
Potsy, the main character of the video game Crackpots
Potsy Ponciroli, co-creator of television series Still the King